This is a list of years in Saudi Arabia.

Kingdom of Saudi Arabia

Emirate of Jebel Shammar

Second Saudi State

Ottoman Arabia

Emirate of Diriyah

18th century

17th century

16th century

See also

 Timeline of Jeddah
 Timeline of Mecca
 Timeline of Medina
 Timeline of Riyadh

Further reading

External links
 

History of Saudi Arabia
Saudi Arabia-related lists
Saudi Arabia